Jahii Carson (born August 31, 1993) is an American professional basketball player who last played for Limburg United of the BNXT League. He played college basketball for Arizona State University where he was co-freshman of the year in the Pac-12 Conference in 2013 and was considered one of the top returning college players for the 2013–14 season.

High school career
Carson played high school basketball at Mesa High School in Mesa, Arizona. As a senior, he set the school records for points (32.2) and assists per game (6.6). At the close of the season, he was named a second-team Parade All-American.

College career
Carson chose to play for coach Herb Sendek at Arizona State. However, he was declared academically ineligible for the 2011–12 season. As a redshirt freshman the following season, Carson averaged 18.5 points and 5.0 assists per game. He was named the Pac-12 co-Freshman of the Year with UCLA's Shabazz Muhammad and a first team All-Pac-12 selection. He was again named first team All-Pac-12 the following season.

On April 16, 2014, he declared for the NBA draft, foregoing his final two years of college eligibility.

Professional career
At the NBA Pre-Draft Combine in May 2014, Carson recorded the equal-best maximum vertical leap from the 59 draft prospects, and historically his measured leaping ability ranked tied 8th all-time for NBA draft hopefuls.

After going undrafted in the 2014 NBA draft, Carson joined the Houston Rockets for the 2014 NBA Summer League where he went on to average 8.4 points and 1.6 assists. On August 21, 2014, he signed with the Wollongong Hawks for the 2014–15 NBL season. It was a dismal season for the Hawks as they finished last on the ladder with a 6–22 record. In 27 games, Carson averaged 14.5 points, 2.5 rebounds and 2.4 assists per game.

On February 28, 2015, Carson signed with Metalac Valjevo of Serbia for the rest of the season. On March 17, 2015, he was released by Metalac after appearing in just one game.

On February 19, 2016, Carson signed with Adanaspor of the Turkish Basketball First League.

On October 21, 2016 Carson signed with the Island Storm of the NBL Canada

On August 7, 2017, Carson signed with Koroivos of the Greek Basket League.

On August 3, 2018, Carson returned to the NBL Canada, signing with the Moncton Magic. Carson left the Magic after six games to join BCM U Pitești in Romania. He also had a brief stint with APOEL.

In May 2020, Carson signed with Úrvalsdeild karla club Þór Þorlákshöfn.

On June 19, 2021, he has signed with Limburg United of the BNXT League. In nine games, Carson averaged 7.6 points, 3.0 assists and 2.3 rebounds per game. He parted ways with the team on November 17.

Personal
Carson is the son of Jonathan and Vanae Carson.

References

External links
Arizona State Sun Devils bio
ESPN.com Profile
Eurobasket.com Profile

1992 births
Living people
Adanaspor Basketbol players
American expatriate basketball people in Australia
American expatriate basketball people in Canada
American expatriate basketball people in Greece
American expatriate basketball people in Romania
American expatriate basketball people in Serbia
American expatriate basketball people in Turkey
American expatriate basketball people in Iceland
American men's basketball players
Arizona State Sun Devils men's basketball players
Basketball players from Arizona
CSU Pitești players
Island Storm players
KK Metalac Valjevo players
Koroivos B.C. players
Mesa High School alumni
Moncton Magic players
Moncton Miracles players
Parade High School All-Americans (boys' basketball)
Point guards
Sportspeople from Mesa, Arizona
Wollongong Hawks players